Imperial SaGa is a role-playing browser game developed by Think & Feel for web browsers. The eleventh installment in the SaGa series, the game was published by Square Enix in 2015. The service ceased in 2019. Designed as part of the series' 25th anniversary celebrations, it was developed with the supervision of series creator Akitoshi Kawazu.

Set in an original world, the player controls an emperor or empress as they maintain their empire against magical and human threats; while there is an original narrative with a final boss, many of the events are based on the plots and characters of previous SaGa games. Gameplay revolves around exploring a world map and successfully completing battles, which enable soldiers and vassals to strengthen. The turn-based mechanics and usage-based growth system of earlier SaGa games is carried over into Imperial SaGa.

The game was developed as a browser-based equivalent to the mobile phone game Emperors SaGa. Regular series composer Kenji Ito returned to compose and arrange music. The original scenario was created by Emperors Saga writer Moku Tochibori, while additional work and later scenarios by Benny Matsuyama; both of whom had worked on game projects and supplementary material for Square Enix. Since its initial release, Matsuyama has continued to contribute new scenarios for content updates.

Gameplay

Imperial SaGa is a role-playing browser game in which players take the role of a line of Emperors or Empresses; their goal is the defeat enemies, expanding their territory and defending their people. Navigation takes place on a world map, with battles or story events triggering when the player reaches nodes on the map.

The aim is to defeat enemies and boss opponents on the world map to advance the story and raise a character's experience level; players can fight manually, or enable Auto-battle. Combat uses a turn-based combat system, with each side using group configurations called Formations to attack, which can unlock differing attack strategies or activate passive abilities. In addition, using a special item during a boss battle with all five party members active will trigger a special attack where the entire recruited army deals a single attack, resulting in high damage.

Rather than a traditional leveling system, Imperial SaGa uses the usage-based system of earlier SaGa games; actions performed in battle randomly raise a character's statistics, using a skill regularly enough raises the strength of that skill, and new skills are unlocked upon using a similar skill enough times. Each unit has health (HP) and Life Points (LP). LP decreases each time a character is defeated, with LP needing to recharge outside battle. If a character loses all LP, they are unable to take part in combat until their LP is replenished.

Development and release
Imperial SaGa was developed by Japanese studio Think & Feel, who had previously worked with Square Enix on the Nintendo DS titles Final Fantasy XII: Revenant Wings and Blood of Bahamut. Imperial SaGa was the first SaGa game developed for PC browser platforms. Development began in 2012 after Square Enix producer Kei Hirono saw the strong positive reception of the mobile game Emperors SaGa; his aim was to create an equivalent experience for browsers and begin a series of similar expansions for the SaGa franchise. Hirono acted as the game's producer, and directed by Tomotaka Shiroichi. Series creator Akitoshi Kawazu acted as executive producer and general supervisor for the project. Work on Imperial SaGa ran parallel to both the continued support for Emperors SaGa and the upcoming SaGa: Scarlet Grace. While Emperors SaGa had been a card-based battle game, Imperial SaGa was designed with gameplay similar to the rest of the SaGa series.

The music was composed by Kenji Ito, who first co-composed the music for Final Fantasy Legend II and was sole composer for the Romancing SaGa games and SaGa Frontier. Ito worked on the project in parallel to creating the soundtrack for Scarlet Grace. When Hirono first contacted Ito, his request was for an original soundtrack which would also honor the series' musical legacy. The original tracks were recorded using a live orchestra. Arrangements were created for the various tracks for different story routes, handled primarily by Noriyuki Kamikura and Noritoshi Narita. The lyrics for vocal tracks were written by Kawazu.

The original scenario was written by Moku Tochibori, who had previously worked on Emperors SaGa, in addition to game titles including Metal Gear Acid and Final Fantasy Type-0. Tochibori was helped in writing the scenario by Benny Matsuyama, who had created supplementary material related to Square Enix's games for publisher Studio BentStuff. Matsuyama continued to contribute to later scenarios. Commenting on his work, Matsuyama said that the characters' set personas made the scenarios easy to write. The scenario was generally supervised by Kawazu. The succession of rulers which played a part in the narrative was directly inspired by Romancing SaGa 2. During his work on the game, Tochibori's writing ended up influencing a quest for Emperors SaGa based on Romancing SaGa 2 after his scenario impressed Kawazu. The dark tone was intended to reflect both Romancing SaGa and SaGa Frontier.

The promotional and original character artwork was created by series artist Tomomi Kobayashi, who was brought in to appeal to long-time fans of the SaGa series. Other new characters and redesigns of earlier protagonists being handled by Kurahana Chinatsu, noted for her work on Uta no Prince-sama. Chinatsu was brought on board the project to bring in players new to the series. Despite the contrasting styles of Kobayashi and Chinatsu, Hirono did not want to force Chinatsu to mimic the older art style, and Kawazu was pleased that her designs remained original while fitting into the SaGa series. The character sprites were created using a modern form of the "dot graphic" pixel art used in early SaGa titles.

Imperial SaGa was first announced during a special livestream alongside SaGa: Scarlet Grace; the two games were announced as part of the series' 25th anniversary celebrations. Pre-registration for the game opened in May 2015, offering rewards of characters themed after Romancing SaGa 2. The game released on multiple browser platforms on June 18, 2015, with later versions launching for new browser servers in 2016. Following its initial release, general feedback was positive, with future updates addressing complaints about LP recovery rates. Later updates also added new difficulty settings and gameplay adjustments, and an official guidebook was released on December 17, 2017.

Square announced that it would end support for Imperial Saga in December 2019 due to waning support for Adobe Flash.

Notes

References

External links

2015 video games
Imperial SaGa
Fantasy video games
Browser games
Japan-exclusive video games
Role-playing video games
Square Enix games
Video games developed in Japan